Anna Ciepielewska (7 January 1936 – 20 May 2006) was a Polish actress. She appeared in more than forty films from 1955 to 2004.

Filmography

References

External links 

1936 births
2006 deaths
Polish film actresses